"The Good, the Bad and the Pretty" is a song co-written and recorded by Canadian country artist Tim Hicks. The track was co-written with Derek Hoffman and Deric Ruttan. It was the lead single off Hicks' 2021 extended play Campfire Troubador.

Background
"The Good, the Bad and the Pretty" was the first song Hicks had released in eight months. He remarked that the song is "about that one bar in every town, that welcomes all sorts of characters on any given night", adding "it represents a lot of the bars I played on a nightly basis for years". Hicks said he made many friends in those bars, calling them "the best people" and wanted to "pay tribute to them" with this song.

Critical reception
Matthew Weaver of Country104 said the song was released "just in time for spring, sunshine and the outdoors".

Charts

References

2021 songs
2021 singles
Tim Hicks songs
Open Road Recordings singles
Songs written by Tim Hicks
Songs written by Deric Ruttan